Noë Dussenne (born 7 April 1992) is a Belgian footballer who currently plays for Standard Liège in the Belgian First Division A.

External links

1992 births
Living people
Belgian footballers
Belgium youth international footballers
Belgian expatriate footballers
R.A.E.C. Mons players
A.F.C. Tubize players
Cercle Brugge K.S.V. players
Royal Excel Mouscron players
F.C. Crotone players
K.A.A. Gent players
Standard Liège players
Belgian Pro League players
Challenger Pro League players
Serie A players
Expatriate footballers in Italy
Association football defenders
Footballers from Hainaut (province)
Sportspeople from Mons
Belgian expatriate sportspeople in Italy